Festuclavine dehydrogenase (FgaFS, festuclavine synthase) is an enzyme with systematic name festuclavine:NAD+ oxidoreductase. This enzyme catalyses the following chemical reaction

 festuclavine + NAD+  6,8-dimethyl-6,7-didehydroergoline + NADH + H+

The enzyme takes part in the biosynthesis of fumigaclavine C.

References

External links 
 

EC 1.5.1